is a Japanese astronomer and co-discoverer of 13 asteroids with astronomers Kōyō Kawanishi and Matsuo Sugano.

He is also an earth-science teacher of Nada jr/sr highschool. The main-belt asteroid 6559 Nomura is named in his honor.

References 
 

1954 births
Discoverers of asteroids

20th-century Japanese astronomers
Living people